Egloffstein is a municipality in the district of Forchheim in Bavaria in Germany.

Geography

Location 
The village of Egloffstein is a state-recognised climatic spa and lies in the valley of the Trubach river on the hillside beneath the eponymous castle.

Neighbouring communities 
Its neighbouring communities (clockwise from the north) are:

Gößweinstein, Obertrubach, Gräfenberg, Leutenbach, Pretzfeld

Administrative subdivisions 
Egloffstein is divided into 16 parishes:

 Affalterthal above Egloffstein in the upper part of the Mostvieler valley.
 Bieberbach is well known for its great Osterbrunnen. In 2005, however, it had to concede its title as the "Greatest Osterbrunnen in the World" to Sulzbach-Rosenberg. The village is first recorded in 1225.
 Hundshaupten is known for its wildlife enclosure and petting zoo, and for the castle of Hundshaupten.

Attractions 
Above the village stands the former mediaeval Egloffstein Castle of the lords of Egloffstein.

There is an open-air swimming pool that dates to before the war.

References

 
Forchheim (district)